Tilen is a name given to a legend Slovenian masculine name, which is a variant of the name Giles.

Notable people with this name
Tilen Bartol (born 1997), Slovenian ski jumper
Tilen Debelak (born 1991), Slovenian alpine skier
Tilen Klemenčič (born 1995), Slovenian footballer
Tilen Kodrin (born 1994), Slovenian handball player
Tilen Nagode (born 1996), Slovenian footballer
Tilen Sirše (born 1990), Slovenian luger
Tilen Žitnik (born 1991), Slovenian tennis player

See also
Giles (given name)

References

Slovene masculine given names